Vukojević (Cyrillic script: Вукојевић) is a South Slavic surname. Notable people with the surname include:

Igor Vukojević (born 1975), Bosnian singer
Lea Vukojević (born 1993), Croatian handball player
Ognjen Vukojević (born 1983), Croatian football player

Serbian surnames